Nepomuk is a town in Plzeň-South District in the Plzeň Region of the Czech Republic. It has about 3,700 inhabitants. It is known as the birthplace of Saint John of Nepomuk, who was born here around 1340 and whose statue can be seen on the town square.

Administrative parts
The town is made up of two administrative parts: Nepomuk and Dvorec.

Etymology
The town was originally named Pomuk; the origin of the name is unclear. According to legend, it is derived from the rain that descended on the region after the blessing of Saint Adalbert in 992 (from the Old Czech pomoknout 'to make wet').

Geography
It lies in the Blatná Uplands. The Mihovka Brook flows through the town. East of the town are two notable ponds, Dvorecký and Panský, and there are also several other ponds in the territory.

History
The first written mention of Pomuk is from 1144 when a new Cistercian monastery was built nearby. The monastery was destroyed by Hussite army in 1420 and now there is the village of Klášter. In 1384, Pomuk was merged with neighbouring Přesanice and renamed Nepomuk. It was promoted to a town in 1413.

After the monastery was destroyed, its properties were acquired by Lords of Schwamberg and then by the Sternberg family. The greatest development of the town is connected with the Baroque period, when Nepomuk was an important pilgrimage site. After confusion, when Nepomuk was alternately called a town and a market town, the town status was confirmed by Charles VI in 1730.

Demographics

Sights

The main landmark of the town centre is the Church of Saint John of Nepomuk. It was originally an early Baroque church from the mid-17th century, but it was completely rebuilt by Kilian Ignaz Dientzenhofer in 1734–1738.

The Church of Saint James the Great was originally a Romanesque church built in 1142–1153. It was then rebuilt in the early Gothic style at the end of the 13th century and in 1360–1370. The church was abolished in 1786 and the building served as a granary until 1857. In 1859–1860, it was reconstructed in the pseudo-Gothic style and since 1860, it has been a parish church. The separate late Baroque bell tower was built next to the church in 1780–1790.

Notable people
John of Nepomuk (c. 1345–1393), saint
Augustin Němejc (1861–1938), painter
Marie Poledňáková (1941–2022), film director and screenwriter; raised here

Twin towns – sister cities

Nepomuk is twinned with:

 Anykščiai, Lithuania
 Bušince, Slovakia
 Hukvaldy, Czech Republic
 Kemnath, Germany
 Krupina, Slovakia
 Omiš, Croatia
 Roermond, Netherlands
 São João Nepomuceno, Brazil
 Wisła, Poland

References

External links

Cities and towns in the Czech Republic
Populated places in Plzeň-South District